Rear-Admiral Tufton Percy Hamilton Beamish, CB, DL (26 July 1874 – 2 May 1951) was an English naval officer and Conservative Party politician. He married Margaret Simon in 1914.  The couple had two daughters and one surviving son, Tufton Beamish, Baron Chelwood.

Tufton Beamish led a distinguished naval and political career. He was twice Member of Parliament (MP) for Lewes: from 1924 to 1931, and again from 1936 to 1945.  His son Tufton succeeded him in at the 1945 general election and represented the seat until 1974.

References

External links
 The Dreadnought Project – Tufton Percy Hamilton Beamish
 
 Personal papers held at Churchill College, Cambridge

1874 births
1951 deaths
Conservative Party (UK) MPs for English constituencies
Deputy Lieutenants in England
UK MPs 1924–1929
UK MPs 1929–1931
UK MPs 1935–1945
Royal Navy rear admirals
Companions of the Order of the Bath